Ashleigh Barty and Sally Peers were the defending champions, having won the event in 2012, but Barty decided not to participate this year. Peers partnered up with Stephanie Bengson, but lost in the first round.

Erika and Yurika Sema won the tournament, defeating Monique Adamczak and Olivia Rogowska in the final, 3–6, 6–2, [11–9].

Seeds

Draw

References 
 Draw

Bendigo Women's International 1 - Doubles